The buff-spotted woodpecker (Campethera nivosa) is a species of bird in the family Picidae. It is native to large parts of tropical central Africa. It has an extremely wide range and is an uncommon species, and the International Union for Conservation of Nature has rated its conservation status as being of "least concern".

Description
The male has a dark olive or blackish crown and a bright red nape, with the other parts of the head whitish or buff streaked with olive. The female lacks the red nape. Both sexes have plain green upper parts, and yellowish-olive or dark olive underparts, spotted or barred with buff. The beak is curved and rather short.

Distribution and habitat
The buff-spotted woodpecker is native to the African tropical rainforest.

Ecology
The buff-spotted woodpecker feeds largely on black ants (Crematogaster) and termites which it finds on trees. It is an inconspicuous, silent bird, often foraging singly or in pairs in the understorey layers of the forest, or it may form part of small groups of mixed species.

Status
The buff-spotted woodpecker has an extremely wide range and is a common species in some localities, though less so in others. No particular threats have been recognised and the population is presumed to be steady. The International Union for Conservation of Nature has rated its conservation status as being of "least concern".

References

Further reading

buff-spotted woodpecker
Birds of the Gulf of Guinea
buff-spotted woodpecker
Taxonomy articles created by Polbot